The Tenth Census of Bolivia was conducted on 5 September 2001. The population was 8,274,325.

References 

2001 in Bolivia
Censuses in Bolivia
Bolivia